Stanley T. H. Williams (25 June 1917 – 2002) was a British motorcycle speedway rider for Sheffield and Coventry.

Born in Blaby, Leicestershire in June 1917, Williams started grasstrack racing at the age of seventeen, pushing his bike the eighteen miles from Leicester to Nottingham to take part in his first race. His first speedway experience was from practice sessions at the Leicester Super stadium, later practising at Dagenham. He was signed by Sheffield in 1938, suffering mechanical problems in his first season that saw him close to giving up, but he developed greatly the following year, working under Bluey Wilkinson, including beating Lionel Van Praag in a race at Harringay and reaching the semi-final of the World Championship.

After serving in the Royal Air Force during World War II, he returned to Sheffield as team captain in 1946, leading the team to a second-place finish in the Northern League. A broken ankle in 1946 and a broken wrist in 1947 limited his racing, and he spent much of his time tutoring his younger brother Len, who broke into the Sheffield team in 1947.

Williams stayed with Sheffield until the end of the 1949 season, moving on to Coventry Bees at the start of 1950. He spent four seasons with Coventry before retiring in 1953. He later returned to Coventry as team manager. In the 1960s he managed Newport Wasps.

References

1917 births
2002 deaths
British speedway riders
Coventry Bees riders
English motorcycle racers
Sheffield Tigers riders
Sportspeople from Leicester
Royal Air Force personnel of World War II